Malta–Russia relations refers to bilateral foreign relations between Malta and Russia. Malta has an embassy in Moscow and an honorary consulate in Saint Petersburg. Russia has an embassy in San Ġwann and cultural centre in Valletta.

History
Relations between the two countries were established in 1698 by Ramon Perellos y Roccaful, the Grand Master of the Order of St. John, exactly a century before the Order's expulsion from Malta.

From 1799 to 1800, the Russian Empire supported Maltese rebels against the French occupation of Malta.

After the 2022 Russian invasion of Ukraine started, Malta, as one of the EU countries, imposed sanctions on Russia, and Russia added all EU countries to the list of "unfriendly nations".

Further reading
"Malta question"

Gallery

See also
Foreign relations of Malta
Foreign relations of Russia
List of ambassadors of Russia to Malta

References

External links
Coordination Board of Russian Compatriots in Malta
Maltese representations in Russia
 Russian embassy in San Ġwann

 
Russia
Bilateral relations of Russia